Udea pyraustiformis is a moth in the family Crambidae. It was described by Sergiusz Graf von Toll in 1948. It is found in Iran.

References

pyraustiformis
Moths described in 1948